As Above, So Below is the second studio album by Australian psychedelic rock band Stonefield. It was announced on 9 May 2016 on their Facebook page.

Track listing

Personnel

Stonefield
 Amy Findlay – vocals, drums
 Hannah Findlay – guitar
 Holly Findlay – bass
 Sarah Findlay – keyboards, vocals

Production
 Dave Walker – mastering
 John Lee – producer

Charts

References

2016 albums
Stonefield (band) albums